The Masquerade is a mid-sized concert venue located in Atlanta, Georgia, United States. It is located in Kenny's Alley, the lowest level of Underground Atlanta. The address for the parking deck and entrance is 75 Martin Luther King Jr, DR, SW.

Venue history and layout

The Masquerade was founded in 1988 at the historic DuPre Excelsior Mill, a former excelsior mill at 695 North Avenue in the Old Fourth Ward neighborhood.  The venue had both indoor and outdoor concert space. It was sold in 2006 and moved in late November 2016 after it was made part of a new mixed-use development called North + Line.  The building was designated as historic by the city and all of the original parts will be saved through adaptive reuse, though many of the other attachments and the music park used by the Masquerade are being removed.

Its live music mostly consists of alternative music styles, such as indie rock, metal, punk rock, rockabilly, and electronic, ranging from local acts to ones internationally known.  The Masquerade's three principal interior stages are named after the destinations of the afterlife: Heaven, Purgatory, and Hell — though they are now all on the same level with separate entrances.  At the mill, Heaven was upstairs above Hell at the right (west) side of the building, with Purgatory as the bar area downstairs to the left, all accessed from a central entryway behind the box office with a stairway to Heaven.

Notable musical performances

Well-known acts that have performed there include alternative groups like Nirvana, Smashing Pumpkins, 311, The Cranberries, Green Day, Radiohead, Widespread Panic (from Athens) in '92, Flaming Lips, Blind Melon, Phish, Blur, Dave Matthews Band, Faith No More, Foo Fighters, Weezer, Queens of the Stone Age, Oasis, Afghan Whigs, The Killers, Panic at the Disco, Curve, and Manchester Orchestra (from ATL) in '07; Devon Allman (son of the late Gregg Allman from Macon) played there in '18; mainstream acts like INXS, Björk, Macklemore and Coldplay; and punk and metal acts like The Ramones, Fugazi, Motörhead, Alice in Chains, Stone Temple Pilots, Rage Against the Machine, Tool, Iron Maiden, Marilyn Manson, Misfits, Social Distortion, Danzig, Blink 182, Dropkick Murphys, Amon Amarth, Sevendust (from ATL) in '09, Mastodon (from Atlanta) in '12, Baroness (from Savannah) in '17, and BACKTOEARTH in '19.  Electronic and industrial acts have included Curren$y, The Orb, Chemical Brothers, Orbital, The Prodigy, and Nine Inch Nails; other genres include parodist "Weird Al" Yankovic and the hiphop/rap of Public Enemy.

References

Nightclubs in the United States
Music venues in Georgia (U.S. state)